White whale or beluga whale is an Arctic and sub-Arctic species of cetacean.

White Whale may also refer to:
 White Whale (band), a band based in Lawrence, Kansas
"White Whale" (Brooklyn Nine-Nine), 2018 TV sitcom episode
"White Whale" (song), track on Everything Everything 2017 album A Fever Dream
 Operation White Whale, a 2005 international money-laundering ring
 White Whale Records, a defunct 1960s record label
Hakugei (roller coaster), a roller coaster in Nagashima Spa Land
 White whale, a mabeast creature in the 2016 anime series Re:Zero − Starting Life in Another World

See also

 Great White Whale, a 2008 album by Secret and Whisper
 Migaloo, a white humpback whale that frequents the Australian coastline
 Essex (1799 whaleship) whaler
 Moby-Dick
 Narwhal
 Sperm whale